The German surname Uffermann, as in other variants or Ufermann and Ufferman, has its origin in the occupation of a banker. Some German surnames are linked to the professions, the endings "-er" and "-mann" usually indicate a person doing a particular function, where "banker".

In Germany, there are records of births of people with the surname Uffermann in the western part, especially in the cities of Duisburg and Bedburg-Hau. Families with this name tend to be small and confined to the West German territory. In the United States of America, the number of people with this surname is small and all members have a direct relationship with German relatives. In the Americas, specifically in southern Brazil, there is a family with the surname Uffermann.

References

German-language surnames
Occupational surnames